Gamman is a surname. Notable people with the surname include:

Lorraine Gamman (born 1957), English design professor
Louise Gamman (born 1983), English basketball player

See also
Gammans
Hamman